The  is a kofun burial mound located in the Ano neighborhood of the city of Tsu, Mie Prefecture in the Kansai region of Japan. It was designated a National Historic Site of Japan in 1952.

Overview
The Akeae Kofun is located at the eastern end of a low hill with an elevation of 40 meters extending from the eastern foot of Kyogamine in the middle of the Ano River in central Mie Prefecture. It is an extremely unusual -type tumulus, which is shaped like an hourglass when viewed from above, consisting of trapezoidal mounds that extend from either side of a large square central mound. Cylindrical haniwa, shield-shaped haniwa, house-shaped haniwa, and other figurative haniwa were excavated from the top and upper tier of the main burial mound, which date its construction to the first half of the middle Kofun period (first half of the 5th century AD). Fukiishi have also been found on the surface of the mound, and fragments of Sue ware pottery have also been discovered. The tumulus was also once surrounded by a moat. However, the burial chamber and grave goods are not known, as the interior of tumulus has never been excavated. 

The kofun was discovered in 1945. It is one of a cluster of eight tumuli that were once in this area, of which this tumulus and five smaller ones survive. The area is now open to the public as the 

Total length 81.1 meters:
Central portion 60.0 x 48.3 meters x 1.7 to 2.5 meters (lower tier) / 42 x 15 meters x 6.0 to 7.0 meters (upper tier)
North extension 10.0 meters long x 17.4 meters wide x 1.8 meters high
South extension 13.0 meters ling x 21 meters wide x 1.7 to 20 meters high

Gallery

See also
List of Historic Sites of Japan (Mie)

References

External links

Tsu city tourist information site 
Cultural properties of Mie Prefecture 

Kofun
Tsu, Mie
Historic Sites of Japan
History of Mie Prefecture
Ise Province